Arco is a commercial, locomotive-hauled passenger train service operated in Spain by Renfe on the Levante and Basque Country-Galicia lines.

Routes

As of 2021, the Renfe Arco services run on the following routes:

 La Coruña / Vigo - Bilbao / San Sebastian - Hendaye (Arco Camino de Santiago)
 La Coruña - Monforte de Lemos
 Barcelona - Castellón - Córdoba - Sevilla / Málaga (Arco García Lorca)
 Linares-Baeza - Granada / Almeria

Until 2 May 2008, the trains were operating on the Mediterranean corridor, between Barcelona, Alicante and Murcia.  There was also an Arco train service from Porbou / Cerbere (France) and Valencia Nord.

Technical data 
Arco fully renovated and refurbished Renfe's B11x-10200 series of passenger trains. New bogies, capable of working at 220 km/h, were added.  The bogies are modified versions of model GC-1 by CAF, also known as GC-3, allowing a higher degree of comfort at higher speeds.

 Operated lines: 
 Manufacturers: Renfe, CAF
 Units manufactured: 41
 Year established: 1999
 Top speed: 220 km/h
 Commercial Speed: 200 km/h
 Beam heating: Yes, 3 kV (CC)
 Gauge: 1,668 mm

See also
Renfe Operadora

External links

High-speed rail in Spain
Renfe